Rugby union is a minor sport in Macau.

Macau has a national side, which competes in international competitions, and there is also Macau Rugby Club, which takes part in various Seniors (adult) competitions . Macau also has a Junior (children's) club, called the Macau Bats Rugby Club, which competes in regional/international tournaments. Beach rugby and rugby tens tournaments have been held in the territory, and the game benefits from rugby's much stronger presence in neighbouring Hong Kong.

A representative national Women's side played in the classification stages of the 2004 Hong Kong Women's Sevens.

See also
 Rugby union in China
 Rugby union in Hong Kong
 Rugby union in Taiwan
 Yellow Sea Cup

References

External links
 Macau Rugby
 Rugby in Asia, Macau page
 Asian Rugby Football Union

 
Sport in Macau